Unión Deportiva Melilla "B" is a Spanish football team based in the autonomous city of Melilla. The reserve team of UD Melilla, the club was refounded in 2013 after a merger with Casino del Real CF, and holds home matches at Estadio La Espiguera, which has a capacity of 2,000 spectators.

Season to season

Merger with Casino del Real CF

4 seasons in Tercera División

References

External links
Official website 
La Preferente team profile 

Football clubs in Melilla
UD Melilla
Association football clubs established in 2013
2013 establishments in Spain
Spanish reserve football teams